Southside is an unincorporated community in Montgomery County, Tennessee, United States. Southside had a post office until it closed on October 12, 2002; it still has its own ZIP code, 37171.

Historic Collinsville, a living museum of 19th-century life, is located near Southside. The Lafayette Furnace, which is listed on the National Register of Historic Places, is also near the community.

References

Unincorporated communities in Montgomery County, Tennessee
Unincorporated communities in Tennessee